Trans-Golgi network integral membrane protein 2 is a protein that in humans is encoded by the TGOLN2 gene.

References

Further reading